Thorvald Stoltenberg (8 July 1931 – 13 July 2018) was a Norwegian politician and diplomat. He served as Minister of Defence from 1979 to 1981 and Minister of Foreign Affairs from 1987 to 1989 and again from 1990 to 1993 in two Labour governments. 

From 1989 to 1990 he served as the Norwegian ambassador to the UN. In 1990, he became the United Nations High Commissioner for Refugees but served only one year before he rejoined the Norwegian government. In 1992, Stoltenberg, together with nine Baltic Ministers of Foreign Affairs and an EU commissioner, founded the Council of the Baltic Sea States (CBSS) and the EuroFaculty. In 1993 appointed Special Representative of the UN Secretary-General for the former Yugoslavia and UN Co-Chairman of the Steering Committee of the International Conference on the former Yugoslavia. Thorvald Stoltenberg was also the UN witness at the signing of Erdut Agreement.

In 2003 he was appointed chairman of the board of International Institute for Democracy and Electoral Assistance (International IDEA). Between 1999 and 2008 he was President of the Norwegian Red Cross, the only president to serve three terms. He was also a member of the Trilateral Commission, and held a seat on their executive committee.

At the local level, Stoltenberg was elected to the Oslo City Council in 2015.

Youth
Stoltenberg was born in Oslo, the son of Ingeborg (b. Andresen, 1904-1992) and major Theodor Emil Stoltenberg (1900-1998). In his youth Stoltenberg became heavily involved in the organization of Hungarian refugees fleeing the invading Soviet Army in 1956. In one particular situation, evacuating refugees by boat in the middle of the night, he jumped into the strong currents, risking his own life to save one of the boats. One of the other rescuers, future famous American journalist Barry Farber called this the greatest act of courage he has ever seen in his life. Stoltenberg himself kept the story a secret, until Farber in December 2006 revealed it on the Norwegian talk-show Først & sist.

Special Representative of the Secretary-General (SRSG)
In "May 1993, the UN's co-chair at the International Conference on the former Yugoslavia, Th. Stoltenberg was appointed Special Representative of the Secretary-General (SRSG). As such, he acted as head of the UN mission in the former Yugoslavia and served as the first point of contact for the Department of Peacekeeping Operations in New York. All contacts between UNPROFOR in Zagreb and the UN in New York had to run via his office (...) Mr Stoltenberg was responsible for the coordination of all UNPROFOR operations, which also entailed assessments of the political implications of operational decisions as well as the actions of the conflicting parties. In practice, this combination of tasks was impossible to juggle. A serious conflict is said to have occurred between Thorvald Stoltenberg and General Wahlgren's successor, General J. Cot of France".

Cot disagreed with Stoltenberg about the latter's role as SRSG, and at the end of 1993 the two tasks were again split up. Stoltenberg stayed on as co-chair of the peace negotiations in Geneva on behalf of the UN, and on 1 January 1994 the Japanese diplomat Y. Akashi was appointed SRSG responsible for all UNPROFOR operations in the former Yugoslavia. It was he who negotiated with the authorities of the conflicting parties.

Political views

Lobbying for changes in drug policy
In 2010, Stoltenberg led a commission whose primary purpose was to recommend changes in Norwegian drug policy to improve the situation of hard drug addicts. The question of heroin prescription was one of the most controversial topics evaluated by the commission set up by Bjarne Håkon Hanssen. The commission concluded in June 2010 that Norway should start trials with heroin prescription, in addition to making several other changes to its drug policy. He also joined an international campaign for a less punitive drug policy, the Global Commission on Drug Policy, consisting of, among others, former Latin American leaders.

Sanctions against Israel
In 2010, together with 25 other elder statesmen, Stoltenberg sent a letter to EU leaders and the heads of government of the EU countries, demanding sanctions against Israel for its violations of international law. His co-signatories included Javier Solana, Felipe González, Romano Prodi, Lionel Jospin and Mary Robinson.

Private life
He married Karin Heiberg (1931–2012) in 1957. Their son, Jens Stoltenberg (born 1959), followed him into politics and served as Prime Minister of Norway from 2000 to 2001 and from 2005 to 2013, and is the current NATO Secretary-General. They also had two daughters, Camilla (born 1958), a medical researcher and administrator, and Nini (1963–2014) whose heroin addiction has been much publicized. Thorvald Stoltenberg died on 13 July 2018 at the age of 87 after a short illness.

References

External links

Family Genealogy (vestraat.net)

|-

|-

|-

|-

1931 births
2018 deaths
Ambassadors of Norway to Denmark
Foreign Ministers of Norway
Labour Party (Norway) politicians
Norwegian state secretaries
Politicians from Oslo
Permanent Representatives of Norway to the United Nations
Presidents of the Norwegian Red Cross
Thorvald
Israeli–Palestinian peace process
United Nations High Commissioners for Refugees
Spouses of Norwegian politicians
Norwegian officials of the United Nations
Defence ministers of Norway
Diplomats from Oslo